The 1977 Milan–San Remo was the 68th edition of the Milan–San Remo cycle race and was held on 19 March 1977. The race started in Milan and finished in San Remo. The race was won by Jan Raas of the Frisol team.

General classification

References

1977
1977 in road cycling
1977 in Italian sport
1977 Super Prestige Pernod